Alexis Yougouda Kada (born 29 November 1994) is a Cameroonian professional footballer who plays as a midfielder for Moroccan club Maghreb de Fés. In 2013, he made an international appearance for the Cameroon national team.

Career
Born in Mokolo, Kada has played club football for Coton Sport, Nantes B and Örgryte.

He made his international debut for Cameroon in 2013.

References

1994 births
Living people
Cameroonian footballers
Cameroon international footballers
Superettan players
Coton Sport FC de Garoua players
FC Nantes players
Örgryte IS players
Maghreb de Fès players
Association football midfielders
Cameroonian expatriate footballers
Cameroonian expatriate sportspeople in France
Expatriate footballers in France
Cameroonian expatriate sportspeople in Sweden
Expatriate footballers in Sweden
Cameroonian expatriate sportspeople in Morocco
Expatriate footballers in Morocco